Reptilia is Canada's largest indoor reptile zoo, with  of indoor exhibits featuring over 250 reptiles, amphibians and arachnids.

Currently there are two Ontario locations, one in Vaughan and one in Whitby.

Locations
The original Reptilia zoo was established in Vaughan; it is housed in a  facility. In 2018, it opened a second location in Whitby in a former  Rona store. In late 2018, it announced plans to create similar zoos in London and Barrie. London City Council rejected the proposal for a  reptile zoo in Westmount Mall.

Attractions

About 250 species of reptiles are in the zoo's collection. The zoo also contains  pythons, anacondas, poison dart frogs, rattlesnakes, and more. About 75% of animals are rescues, with the remainder either born on location or acquired from other accredited facilities. Of the rescues, many are obtained from previous owners who cannot cope with animals that have achieved their adult size, for which the zoo receives "constant calls". The zoo takes in about 75 such animals every year, many of which are later sent to other facilities.

Each location has a theatre area in which the zoo exhibits interactive reptile shows.

Educational curriculum
Reptilia provides curriculum compliant educational programs from kindergarten to grade 12 along with specialized post secondary programs for first responders, educators, animal control officers and veterinarians. Educational programs are provided at Reptilia, as well as through the transportation of reptiles to various schools to provide lessons in school classrooms. Lessons are typically of 1 hour duration.

Reptilia interacts closely with other educational organizations, supplying reptiles and other supplies to the Ontario Science Centre, helping the Toronto Zoo with their educational programs, and working with many of the schools in the Greater Toronto Area. Reptilia also has a number of classrooms and party rooms that can be rented out for activities such as birthday parties. Each room is named after a different reptile.

Film industry
Reptilia provides reptiles along with skilled handlers for film productions, photo shoots, and television. Reptilia has provided reptiles for Guinness, Murdoch Mysteries, Canada's Greatest Know-It-All, YTV, Daily Planet, and other shows and productions.

References

External links

Zoos in Ontario
Buildings and structures in Vaughan
Reptiles and humans